Plas Madoc Football Club was a Welsh football club from the Plas Madoc estate in Cefn Mawr, Wrexham County Borough, Wales. The club was founded in 2017 and played in the Welsh National League Premier Division.

On 14 July 2020, an announcement via Twitter confirmed the club had folded.

History
A club by the name of Plasmadoc FC was formed in 1874, and through a series of mergers between various local teams is claimed to be an ancestor of the modern Cefn Druids team who formed in 1992.

The team began playing in the 2017–18 season in the North East Wales League, a competition which it won.

The following season, the team achieved second consecutive promotion when it won the Welsh National League Division One.

Seasons

Honours

League
Welsh National League (Wrexham Area) Division One
Winner (1): 2019

North East Wales Football League
Winner (1): 2018

Cups

References

Welsh National League (Wrexham Area) Premier Division clubs
2017 establishments in Wales
Association football clubs established in 2017
Football clubs in Wales
Sport in Wrexham County Borough
Association football clubs disestablished in 2020
2020 disestablishments in Wales
Defunct football clubs in Wales
Clwyd East Football League clubs